Sunset shell is a common name for several bivalves with brightly colored shells and may refer to:

Tellina radiata
Several genera in the family Psammobiidae, including:
Gari
Soletellina

Mollusc common names